Bakkiyaraj Kannan (born 2 April 1987) is an Indian film director who works in Tamil film industry. He has directed two films: Remo (2016) and Sulthan (2021).

Personal life 
Kannan married Asha in October 2020.

Career 
When studying S.R.M. College & MGR Movie Television Institute Kannan forayed into films. He began working as an associate director to Atlee for Raja Rani (2013).

He made his directional debut with Remo (2016). The film starred Sivakarthikeyan, Keerthy Suresh, Sathish, Anson Paul. Which was an commercial success at the box-office. He earned a nomination for the Best Tamil Debut Director at the 6th South Indian International Movie Awards.  He also has won Edison Awards for Best Debut Director, for the film.

Kannan's next film as a director was Sulthan (2021).The film starred Karthi, Rashmika Mandanna, Nepoleon, Lal, Yogi Babu.  Which opens a mixed to positive reviews, but was a decent hit at the box-office.

Filmography

Films

Awards & nominations

References

External links 

Indian film directors
21st-century Indian film directors
Film directors from Tamil Nadu
Tamil film directors
Tamil screenwriters
Living people
1981 births